Blow Up Records (or Blow Up) is a British independent record label, that was established in London in May 1994, by Blow Up club founder and DJ Paul Tunkin. There is also an affiliated music publishing company Blow Up Songs.

Music genres of releases from the label include new wave, pop/rock and electronica

Notable releases include one of the first commercially available series of music library compilations 'Blow Up presents Exclusive Blend' (libraries featured include KPM, De Wolfe, Amphonic and Telemusic), 'Blow Up A-Go-Go: Dancefloor Classics' (Blow Up club compilation in conjunction with V2) and several series of limited seven inches featuring bands from across Europe and the UK. Blow Up also released the debut Add N to X album 'Vero Electronics' (1996). Current acts on the label roster include Big Boss Man, Baltic Fleet, The Bongolian, David Woodcock, Daiquiri Fantomas, Mockingbird, Wish Me Luck and Silvery.

Recent releases include 'Towers' (2012), the second album from Baltic Fleet which led to the artist winning the annual Liverpool Echo 'GIT Award' and a performance at Yoko Ono's Meltdown in 2013 which Bloomberg's Robert Heller described as "the psychedelic mid-point between Joy Division and Daft Punk".

Artists
List of artists that have released material under Blow Up Records:

 Add N to X
 Alfa 9
 Aspic Boulevard
 Baltic Fleet
 Big Boss Man
 Capri
 CDOASS
 Cuff
 Daiquiri Fantomas
 David Woodcock
 Eight Legs
 Fay Hallam
 Guy Pedersen
 Katerine
 Komeda
 Lucky 15
 Mockingbird, Wish Me Luck
 Neon Plastix
 Noonday Underground
 Silvery
 Stereo Total
 Strip Music
 The Bongolian
 The Elevators
 The Frank Popp Ensemble
 The Rifles
 The Weekenders
 VA6

Discography
List of Blow Up Records releases (incomplete):

Albums
 BU004/BLOWUP004 - "Vero Electronics", Add N to X (January 1996)
 BU006/BLOWUP006 - "Blow Up Presents Exclusive Blend Volume 1", Various Artists (August 1996)
 BU011 - "Blow Up Presents Exclusive Blend Volume 2", Various Artists (December 1997)
 GOGO - "Blow Up A-Go-Go! Dancefloor Classics from the Legendary Blow Up Club", Various Artists (December 1997)
 BU019 - "Blow Up Presents Exclusive Blend Volume 3", Various Artists (October 2000)
 BU024 - "Blow Up Presents Exclusive Blend Volume 4", Various Artists (October 2001)
 BU040 - "Outer Bongolia", The Bongolian (February 2008)
 BU041 - "Baltic Fleet", Baltic Fleet (March 2008)
 BU050 - "Full English Beat Breakfast", Big Boss Man (September 2009)
 BU054 - "Awesome Moves", Neon Plastix (May 2010)
 BU057 - "Railway Architecture", Silvery (August 2010)
 BU060 - "Bongos For Beatniks", The Bongolian (May 2011)
 BU066 - "Gone To Ground", Alfa 9 (March 2013)
 BU067 - "Lost In Sound", Fay Hallam & The Bongolian (June 2012)
 BU068 - "Towers", Baltic Fleet (August 2012)
 BU078 - "MHz Invasion", Daiquiri Fantomas (August 2013)
 BU089 - "David Woodcock", David Woodcock (August 2014)
 BU090 - "Last Man On Earth", Big Boss Man (September 2014)
 BU099 - "Yéyé Existentialiste", Stereo Total (June 2015)
 BU101 - "Corona", Fay Hallam (October 2015)
 BU102 - "Moog Maximus", The Bongolian (July 2016)
 BU107 - "The Dear One", Baltic Fleet (October 2016)

Singles
 BLOWUP001 - "All Grown Up", The Weekenders (May 1994) [7"]
 BLOWUP002 - "Man Of Leisure", The Weekenders (March 1995) [7"]
 BLOWUP003 - "Inelegantly Wasted In Papa's Penthouse Pad In Belgravia", The Weekenders (June 1995) [7", CD]
 BLOWUP007 - "He Plays Like A Disease", VA6 (August 1996) [7"]
 BU008 - "Snowflakes In Hawaii"/"Mon Coeur Balance", Lucky 15/Katerine (April 1997) [7"]
 BU013 - "Boogie Woogie/Rock'n'Roll", Komeda (April 1998) [7"]
 BU017 - "Sea Groove", Big Boss Man (April 2001) [7"]
 BU021 - "The Light Brigade"/"Hello", Noonday Underground (February 2001) [7"]
 BU029 - "Peace And Quiet", The Rifles (March 2005) [7"]
 BU085 - "Beggars Can't Be Choosers"/"Tease", David Woodcock (November 2013) [7"]

EPs
 BU080 - "The Wilds", Baltic Fleet (May 2013)
 BU095 - "The Adventures of You and Me EP", David Woodcock (February 2015)

References

External links
 Blowup.co.uk
 Blowuprecords.com
 Blow Up Records on YouTube
 Blow Up Records on Myspace
 Label discography at Discogs.com
 Label discography at MusicBrainz

British record labels
Record labels established in 1994
Record labels based in London
British independent record labels